B. D. Satoskar (26 March 1909 – 27 November 2000) was a historian, freedom fighter, publisher and journalist from the state of Goa, India.  He was born in Mashel village of Goa.  Satoskar has authored many books in Marathi as well as Konkani.  He is best known for Gomantak prakriti ani Sanskriti (Goa:Nature and Culture, volumes I-III), an encyclopedic work on history and culture of Goa and the Goans. This work was republished on occasion of his birth centenary, in March 2009.

Legacy
The Directorate of Official Language, Government of Goa has instituted the B. D. Satoskar Marathi Bhasha Puraskar under the Bhasha Puraskar Yojana. The award is conferred upon personalities to honour their contribution to Marathi language. The award consists of rupees one lakh, a memento, manpatra, shawl and a shriphal.

Notes

References
B. D. Satoskar :Vyakti ani vangmay(Marathi), Gomantak Marathi Academy, Panaji

Journalists from Goa
Konkani people
Marathi-language writers
People from North Goa district
Indian publishers (people)